Yavor Ivanov (22 April 1964 – 19 December 2022) was a Bulgarian ice dancer. He competed in the ice dance event at the 1984 Winter Olympics.
He died on 19 December 2022.

References

External links
 

1964 births
2022 deaths
Bulgarian male ice dancers
Olympic figure skaters of Bulgaria
Figure skaters at the 1984 Winter Olympics
Figure skaters from Sofia